Michael Cohen is an American pharmacist, and president of the Institute for Safe Medication Practices (ISMP). He was a 2005 MacArthur Fellow.

Life
He graduated from Temple University with a BS (1968) and MS (1984) in pharmacy. He has also been awarded honorary Doctor of Science degrees from Thomas Jefferson University, the University of the Sciences in Philadelphia and Long Island University, and an honorary Doctor of Public Service degree from the University of Maryland. He wrote a column for the journal Hospital Pharmacy. He writes a column for The Philadelphia Inquirer.

Family
He was married to the late Hedy Goffman Cohen. Hedy was a registered nurse who worked with her husband at ISMP. They have two children, Rachel Cohen and Jennifer Gold.

Works

References

External links
Testimony Before the Committee on Ways and Means, Subcommittee on Health, Congress of the United States, March 27, 2001
https://web.archive.org/web/20120402233719/http://www.pharmacist.com/AM/Template.cfm?Section=Home2&Template=%2FCM%2FContentDisplay.cfm&ContentID=9805

American pharmacists
Temple University alumni
Living people
MacArthur Fellows
Year of birth missing (living people)